Kachin State Government is the cabinet of Kachin State. The cabinet is led by chief minister, Khat Aung.

Cabinet (April 2016–present)

References

State and region governments of Myanmar
Kachin State